Fin Taylor (born 25 July 1990) is an English stand-up comedian.

Early life
Taylor grew up in Oxford, England, and attended Abingdon School.

Career
Taylor began gigging in 2008. He first took a solo show to the Edinburgh Fringe in 2014. His three shows in successive years, "Whitey McWhiteface", "Lefty Tighty Righty Loosey" and "When Harassy Met Sally", led The Scotsman to call him "one of the most discussed, and critically lauded comedian of recent Edinburgh Fringes". His comedic style is often described as "provocative" and antagonistic, though he has earned praise for his ability to "be both edgy and woke within the same joke."

See also
 List of Old Abingdonians

References

External links
Official site

English male comedians
Living people
1990 births
People from Oxford
Alumni of the University of Bristol
People educated at Abingdon School